Gbege, popularly known as the first born saga, is a 2022 Nollywood movie produced and directed by Lancelot Oduwa Imaseun. The movie is centred around the preservation and clarification of Benin Cultures and Traditions and stars popular actors and actresses such as Charles Inojie, Ini Edo, Nosa Rex, Sam Dede, Jide Kosoko, Ebele Okaro, and Omoruyi Akpata.

Plot 
The movie is centred around a first born, Zigzag, who was sentenced to life imprisonment. He lost his father during his jail term and he insisted on performing his late father's rite as demanded by the tradition. However, he has to go through his brother, a politician who will not stop until the tradition is abolished.

Premiere 

The movie was first premiered at the 2022 Nollywood Film Festival Germany (NFFG) that was held in Frankfurt. It got premiered at the 20th Nollywood Film Festival, powered by Ehizoya Golden Entertainment, (EGE) on July 29, 2022. The movie also got premiered privately by the Oba of Benin and some dignitaries before it was finally released in Cinema across the country on October 7, 2022

Cast 
The cast in the movie are;
Jide Kosoko
Ebele Okaro
Sam Dede
Mercy Aigbe,
Ini Edo
Zubby
Sanni Muaizu
Charles Inojie
Harry B,
Broda Shaggi,
Nosa Rex, 
Junior Pope and

References 

2022 films
Nigerian drama films